Lester Bruce McDonald (September 19, 1914 – July 26, 1971) was an American football end in the National Football League (NFL) for the Chicago Bears, Detroit Lions, and the Philadelphia Eagles.  He played college football at the University of Nebraska and was drafted in the first round with the eighth overall pick of the 1937 NFL Draft.

References

1914 births
1971 deaths
American football ends
Chicago Bears players
Detroit Lions players
Nebraska Cornhuskers football players
Philadelphia Eagles players
People from Grand Island, Nebraska
Players of American football from Nebraska